Martiradonna is an Italian surname. Notable people with the surname include:

Francesca Martiradonna (born 1973), Italian basketball player
Mario Martiradonna (1938–2011), Italian footballer

Italian-language surnames
Surnames of Italian origin